The 2012 Houston Dynamo season is the seventh season of the team's existence and the first season in their new soccer-specific stadium, BBVA Compass Stadium. The Dynamo will enter the season as both the defending MLS Cup runners-up and Texas Derby winners. The club also played in the 2012–13 CONCACAF Champions League.

Squad information

Club roster 
As of March 9, 2012.

Player movement

Transfers

In

Out

SuperDraft

Supplemental draft

Club staff

Other information

Regular-season standings 
Eastern Conference

Match results

Preseason 
Kickoff times are in CDT.

Results summary

Results by rounds

MLS regular season

Kickoff times are in CDT.

MLS Cup Playoffs

Kickoff times are in CDT.

Knockout round

Conference semifinals

Conference finals

Championship

U.S. Open Cup

Kickoff times are in CDT.

Champions League

Exhibitions 

Kickoff times are in CDT.

Statistics

Appearances and goals 
Last updated on October 27, 2012.
MLS stats from Houston Dynamo website

|}

Goalkeeper stats
{| border="1" cellpadding="4" cellspacing="0" style="margin: 1em 1em 1em 1em 0; background: #f9f9f9; border: 1px #aaa solid; border-collapse: collapse; font-size: 95%; text-align: center;"
|-
| rowspan="2" style="width:1%; text-align:center;"|No.
| rowspan="2" style="width:70px; text-align:center;"|Nat.
| rowspan="2" style="width:44%; text-align:center;"|Player
| colspan="3" style="text-align:center;"|Total
| colspan="3" style="text-align:center;"|Major League Soccer
|-
|MIN
|GA
|GAA
|MIN
|GA
|GAA
|-
| style="text-align: right;" |1
|
| style="text-align: left;" |Tally Hall
|2946
|33
|1.19
|2946
|33
|1.19
|-
| style="text-align: right;" |30
|
| style="text-align: left;" |Tyler Deric
|0
|0
|0.00
|0
|0
|0.00

Italic: denotes player is no longer with team

Top scorers
{| class="wikitable" style="font-size: 95%; text-align: center;"
|-
!width=60|Rank
!width=60|Nation
!width=60|Number
!width=150|Name
!width=100|Total
!width=100|Major League Soccer
|-
|1
|
|12
|Bruin
|12
|12
|-
|2
|
|11
|Davis
|8
|8
|-
|3
|
|25
|Ching
|5
|5
|-
|4
|
|27
|Garcia
|4
|4
|-
|4
|
|3
|Carr
|4
|4
|-
|4
|
|9
|Kandji
|4
|4
|-
|5
|
|31
|Hainault
|2
|2
|-
|5
|
|32
|Boswell
|2
|2
|-
|5
|
|16
|Moffat
|2
|2
|-

Uniforms

Miscellany

Allocation ranking 
Houston is in the #18 position in the MLS Allocation Ranking. The allocation ranking is the mechanism used to determine which MLS club has first priority to acquire a U.S. National Team player who signs with MLS after playing abroad, or a former MLS player who returns to the league after having gone to a club abroad for a transfer fee. A ranking can be traded, provided that part of the compensation received in return is another club's ranking.

International roster spots 
Houston has 6 MLS International Roster Slots for use in the 2012 season. Each club in Major League Soccer is allocated 8 international roster spots, which can be traded. Houston has previously dealt one spot to New York on 17 March 2009 and dealt another spot to New York on 14 January 2005 while the Houston franchise was still based in San Jose. Press reports did not indicate if or when these roster spots would revert to Houston. On 21 July 2011, Houston traded an international roster spot for the remainder of the 2011 season only to Portland Timbers.

Future draft pick trades 
Future picks acquired:
2013 MLS SuperDraft Round 1 pick from Portland Timbers;
2014 MLS SuperDraft Round 4 pick from Los Angeles Galaxy.

Future picks traded:
2013 MLS SuperDraft Round 4 pick to Colorado Rapids;
2013 MLS SuperDraft conditional pick to Montreal Impact;
2014 MLS SuperDraft Round 4 pick to Portland Timbers;
2014 MLS SuperDraft conditional pick to Colorado Rapids;
2014 MLS SuperDraft conditional pick to Toronto FC;
2015 MLS SuperDraft Round 4 pick to Columbus Crew.

References

Houston Dynamo FC seasons
Houston Dynamo
Houston Dynamo
Houston Dynamo season